The Calumet and Hecla Mining Company was a major copper-mining company based within Michigan's Copper Country. In the 19th century, the company paid out more than $72 million in shareholder dividends, more than any other mining company in the United States during that period.

History
In 1864, Edwin J. Hulbert discovered a copper-bearing section of what became known as the Calumet Conglomerate of Precambrian age. The find was in Houghton County, Michigan, between the rich Cliff mine to the northeast, and the copper mines of Portage Lake to the southwest, but a long way from either. Hulbert formed the Hulbert Mining Company in 1864 to acquire the land rights, before creating the Calumet Company in 1865, with Boston investors. The company spun off the Hecla Company the following year, and assigned shares in the new company to Calumet shareholders.

Hulbert was a major shareholder in both companies, and was in charge of mine operations. But despite the rich ore, Hulbert did not have the practical knowledge to dig out the ore, crush it, and concentrate it. Frustrated with Hulbert's lack of success, the company sent Alexander Agassiz, son of famous geologist Louis Agassiz, to Michigan to run the mine.

Under Agassiz' expert management, the Hecla company paid its first dividend in 1868, and the Calumet company began paying dividends in 1869. The two companies merged in May 1871 to form the Calumet and Hecla Mining Company, with Quincy Adams Shaw as its first president. In August of that year, Shaw retired to the board of directors and Agassiz became president, a position he held until his death.

The town of Red Jacket (now named Calumet) formed next to the mine.

Calumet and Hecla built itself into a copper mining colossus. From 1868 through 1886, it was the leading copper producer in the United States, and from 1869 through 1876, the leading copper producer in the world. From 1871 through 1880, Calumet and Hecla turned out more than half the copper produced in the United States. In each year save one between 1870 and 1901, Calumet and Hecla made most of the copper produced in the Michigan copper district.

By 1901 the underground mining complex had 16 shafts. The company operated a large ore treatment facility at Lake Linden, Michigan. The first smelter was built at Hancock, Michigan, but in 1887, the company moved its smelting to the new smelter at Lake Linden. The company later built a second smelter in Buffalo, New York, which took advantage of the cheap electricity generated from Niagara Falls to electrolytically refine copper. The Buffalo Smelting Works was listed on the National Register of Historic Places in 2011. Electrolytic refining had the advantage that it separated out the silver from the copper.

The neighboring Tamarack mine became the world's deepest mine for some years; it was bought by Calumet and Hecla, and became part of the Calumet and Hecla system.

Annual copper production from the mines peaked in 1906 at 100 million pounds (45,000 metric tons), then declined to 67 million pounds (30,000 metric tons) by 1912 in response to lower prices. Output dropped to 46 million pounds (21,000 metric tons) of refined copper in the strike year of 1913, but rebounded due to high copper prices during World War I to 77 million pounds (35,000 metric tons) in 1917. The boost in production was attained partly by purchase of the Tamarack Mining Company in 1917. Copper prices fell drastically after the war, and in 1921 copper production fell to 15 million pounds (6,800 metric tons) as the company shut the Osceola (amygdaloid) mine in 1920, and shut down mining on the Calumet conglomerate in April 1921.

Copper production rebounded in 1922, and rose steadily through the 1920s. Calumet and Hecla grew in the 1920s by buying and merging with neighboring copper mines. In 1923, Calumet and Hecla merged with the Ahmeek, Allouez, and Centennial mining companies. The combined entity was renamed the Calumet and Hecla Consolidated Copper Company. The merged company essentially controlled all the operating copper mines north of Hancock, Michigan.

The company had always disposed of the mill tailings (locally called stamp sands) in lakes adjacent to the mills, but about 1900 began investigating methods to recover the copper remaining in the waste tailings. Beginning in 1915, Calumet and Hecla began reprocessing the stamp sands at Lake Linden, using a finer grind and ammonia leaching. Once the process proved profitable, the Tamarack mill also began reprocessing tailings. Through 1949, the company had recovered 535 million pounds (243,000 metric tons) of copper by reprocessing tailings. One of the dredges used, Calumet and Hecla Dredge Number One, is currently sunk in shallow water in Torch Lake.

By 1902, Calumet and Hecla had 5,000 employees, and the towns of Calumet (then named Red Jacket), Laurium, and Lake Linden were virtual company towns. The mining superintendents (called "captains") were traditionally Cornishmen; the workers were Finns, Poles, Italians, Irish, and other immigrant nationalities.

Labor issues

Historian Larry Lankton wrote that Calumet and Hecla's success resulted in increased benefits that "trickled down" to workers. This made the company the preferred employer, and it generally had its pick of the best workers. Lankton also noted that the company was willing, when necessary, to "control labor management relations", to use "coercion, covert manipulation, armed deputy sheriffs, or mass firings.

Calumet and Hecla strived to create ideal communities around its mines and mills, in the hope that pleasant living conditions would help the company maintain a loyal and productive workforce. Historian Lankton wrote that in an era and an industry known for hard working conditions, the Michigan copper companies treated their employees better than most: "… they remained known for being among the most enlightened, fair, humane, and paternalistic employers in the American mining industry." Some credited Calumet and Hecla, as the district’s leading company, for setting the pattern of improved living conditions followed by the others.

In 1868, Calumet and Hecla built the first industrial hospital in the United States. In 1877, Calumet and Hecla started an employee aid fund for ill and injured employees. Participation was voluntary. Each participating worker contributed 50 cents per week, which the company matched. Some writers credit Calumet and Hecla with being one of the first, or even the first, American company to set up an employee health benefits fund. Other Michigan copper companies ran employee aid funds, but Calumet and Hecla was the only Michigan copper mining company to match contributions.

By 1908, the company provided a staff of physicians and a hospital for employees and their families, worker clubhouses with bowling alleys; and employee libraries with reading material in 20 languages. The company also contributed to construction of schools and churches in the community. When the company supplied consumer goods to employees, it used its buying power to provide coal, firewood, and electricity for its tenants at wholesale prices.

Its treatment of employees brought praise from outside the Copper Country. A writer for Harper's Magazine visited a number of iron and copper mines of upper Michigan in 1882, but singled out Calumet and Hecla's labor policies for particular praise. He wrote: "But the Calumet Company have no reason to fear strikes among any portion of their force." In 1898, the Michigan Commissioner of Mineral Statistics enthused: "No mining company in the world treats its employees better than Calumet and Hecla." In 1916, the Arizona Bureau of Mines wrote of Calumet ans Hecla, which had no operations in Arizona: "Probably no mining company in the country has paid more attention to welfare work than has the Calumet and Hecla Mining Company, and its subsidiaries, in the upper Michigan peninsula." The Arizona Bureau of Mines followed with more than a page detailing the employee benefits at Calumet and Hecla in Michigan.

But Calumet and Hecla, like the other mining companies in the Copper Country, was accused of paternalism. The charge of paternalism was not disputed by those in favor of the company, who even embraced the term, and saw it as the policy of enlightened capitalism. Company paternalism was most evident in company housing. Calumet and Hecla built hundreds of company houses, and provided them to married employees at low rents that left no room for any company profit. The company also allowed employees to build about 1,000 houses on rented Calumet and Hecla land, but under terms by which the company could force them to vacate their houses on short notice. Whether in rented company housing, or their own houses located on rented company land, the employees and their families were dependent on the continued good will of the company for the literal roof over their heads. The provision of housing to favored employees also fostered jealousies among those not so favored. Although continued employment with Calumet and Hecla was required for occupancy of company housing, Calumet and Hecla, unlike the Quincy and Copper Range companies, did not evict strikers during the 1913-1914 strike.

1913 strike

In July 1913, the Western Federation of Miners called a general strike against all mines in the Michigan Copper Country. Hundreds of strikers surrounded the Calumet and Hecla mine shafts to prevent others from reporting to work. All Calumet and Hecla mines shut down during the Copper Country Strike of 1913–1914, although the workers were said to be sharply divided on the strike question. The union demanded an 8-hour day, a minimum wage of $3 per day, an end to use of the one-man pneumatic drill, and that the companies recognize it as the employees' representative.

Although Calumet and Hecla paid high wages by Copper Country standards, at the time of the 1913 strike, their wages were lower, and labor hours longer, than at the unionized copper mines of Butte, Montana. After the strike started, the mining companies maintained that it had already been considering a reduction of the work day to eight hours. The company maintained that the lower wages were more than made up by the lower cost of living compared to Butte.

The US Department of Labor report on the strike noted: "The employees of the Calumet and Hecla Co. were better satisfied than those of any other company, and therefore a much smaller proportion of them joined the federation." Fewer Calumet and Hecla employees joined the strike than employees of other mines, and more employees of Calumet and Hecla returned to work than employees of other companies, after the Michigan National Guard arrived on the scene.

The mines reopened under National Guard protection, and many went back to work. The companies instituted the 8-hour day, but refused to set a $3 per day minimum wage, refused to abandon the one-man drill, and also refused to employ Western Federation of Miners members.

Italian Hall disaster

On Christmas Eve 1913, the Western Federation of Miners organized a party for strikers and their families at the Italian Benevolent Society hall in Calumet. The hall was packed with between 400 and 500 people when someone shouted "fire". There was no fire, but 73 people, the vast majority of them children, were crushed to death trying to escape. This became known as the Italian Hall Disaster. The strikers held out until April 1914, but then gave up the strike.

Calumet and Hecla employees were not again unionized until 1943, when the company signed an agreement with the CIO-affiliated International Union of Mine, Mill, and Smelter Workers.

The end of copper mining
During the Great Depression, copper prices dropped, and as a result most copper mines in the Copper Country closed, including Calumet and Hecla. Many mines reopened during World War II, when wartime demand raised the price of copper. After the war copper prices plummeted, and most copper mines closed almost immediately. However, Calumet and Hecla was able to stay afloat due to their practice of acquiring many of the formerly great mines in the Keweenaw during and before the Depression, and as a result outlasted nearly all other mining companies.

The company branched into other minerals after World War II. Calumet and Hecla geologists drilled into a major lead-zinc ore body in Lafayette County in southern Wisconsin in 1947. Ore minerals were galena, sphalerite, calcite, and marcasite. The mine, named the Calumet and Hecla mine, opened in 1949. Calumet and Hecla sold the mine to the Eagle-Picher Company in 1954. The company also diversified into copper-based products, including a copper tube manufacturing business and fertilizers.

Calumet and Hecla opened the Kingston mine in 1965, the first new native copper mine opened in more than 30 years. By 1967, the company was operating six mines in the region. However, the company by this point was not even able to produce enough copper for its internal uses. Universal Oil Products (U.O.P.) bought Calumet and Hecla in April 1968. But in August of that same year the more than 1,000 Calumet and Hecla employees went on strike. The last of its copper mines shut down, and as labor and management were unable to agree, the company shut down the dewatering pumps in 1970. The mines have remained idle ever since, and most are permanently capped.

Today, many Calumet and Hecla company mines and buildings are part of Keweenaw National Historical Park.

Popular culture
Folksinger Woody Guthrie wrote and sang "1913 Massacre", a song about the Italian Hall disaster. His son Arlo Guthrie also recorded the song.

Gallery

See also
 Buffalo Smelting Works
 Solar compass
 Copper mining in Michigan
 Calumet and Hecla Industrial District
 Calumet & Hecla Band
 Copper Country Strike of 1913-1914

References

 
Defunct mining companies of the United States
Houghton County, Michigan
Mining in Michigan
Defunct companies based in Michigan
Agassiz family